The 1984 Lion's Cup was a tennis tournament played on indoor carpet courts in Tokyo, Japan that was part of the 1984 Virginia Slims World Championship Series. The tournament was held from November 12 through November 18, 1984.

Winners

Women's singles

 Manuela Maleeva defeated  Hana Mandlíková 6–1, 1–6, 6–4
 It was Maleeva's 5th title of the year and of her career.

Lion's Cup
Lion's Cup
1984 in Japanese tennis

References